The Gouden Ganzenveer ("Golden goose quill") is a Dutch cultural award initiated in 1955, given annually to a person or organization of great significance to the written and printed word. Recipients are selected by an academy of people from the cultural, political, scientific, and corporate world. Members meet once a year; the winner is announced each year in January and honored in April. From 1995 to 1998 the award was granted by the Koninklijke Nederlandse Uitgeversbond, the Royal Dutch Organization of Publishers; since 2000, it is granted by a separate organization.

Recipients
Note: some years the award was not given.

 1955 – Royal Netherlands Academy of Arts and Sciences
 1957 – , historian
 1960 – Jan Oort, astronomer
 1965 – , art historian
 1980 – , librarian
 1983 – Bernard Lievegoed, psychiatrist and author
 1984 – Hans Freudenthal, mathematician
 1985 – Jan Tinbergen, economist
 1986 – Natuurmonumenten, environmental and cultural organization
 1987 – Armando, painter and writer
 1988 – Loe de Jong, historian
 1989 – Edward Schillebeeckx, theologian
 1990 – , environmental scientist
 1991 – "Cultural Supplement" section of NRC Handelsblad
 1992 – Arthur Lehning, writer and historian
 1996 – Henk Hofland, journalist
 1999 – 
 2002 – Michaël Zeeman, critic and writer
 2003 – Jan Blokker, writer and journalist
 2004 – Kees van Kooten, writer
 2005 – Maria Goos, writer
 2006 – Peter van Straaten, artist and writer
 2007 – Tom Lanoye, writer
 2008 – Joost Zwagerman, writer
 2009 – Adriaan van Dis, writer
 2010 – Joke van Leeuwen, writer and illustrator
 2011 – Remco Campert, poet and writer
 2012 – Annejet van der Zijl, writer
 2013 – Ramsey Nasr, poet, writer, actor, and director
 2014 – David Van Reybrouck
 2015 – Geert Mak, journalist and writer
 2016 – , journalist
 2017 – Arnon Grunberg
2018 – Antjie Krog

References

Dutch literary awards